Tropical Cyclone Tasha was a short-lived, but devastating tropical cyclone that exacerbated widespread floods in Queensland, Australia during the 2010 Christmas holiday.

Meteorological history

Tropical Cyclone Tasha was first identified on 24 December 2010 by the Joint Typhoon Warning Centre (JTWC) as a weak area of low pressure accompanied by increasing deep convection. At the surface, the structure of the storm's circulation was uncertain as feeder bands provided a clear indication of its centre; however, the lack of westerly winds at the surface refuted this. Later on 24 December, the Australian Bureau of Meteorology (BOM) classified the system as a tropical low. Shortly thereafter, the system rapidly consolidated as deep convection formed around a well-defined low-level circulation. This prompted the JTWC to issue a Tropical Cyclone Formation Alert as they anticipated the system to intensify into a tropical cyclone within the following 24 hours. At 16:00 UTC, the BOM upgraded the low to a Category 1 cyclone, assigning with the name Tasha.

Within hours of the BoM declaring Tasha a tropical cyclone, the JTWC followed suit and issued their first advisory on the storm, designating it as Tropical Cyclone 04P. Situated along the northwestern edge of a subtropical ridge, Tasha tracked southwestward towards Queensland, Australia and intensified. The storm attained its peak intensity on 24 December with winds of 75 km/h (45 mph) and a barometric pressure of 993 mbar (hPa; 29.32 inHg). Hours later, the centre of Tasha made landfall between Cairns and Innisfail at this intensity. Later that day, the BOM issued their final advisory on Tasha as it weakened to a tropical low over Queensland; the JTWC followed suit shortly thereafter. The remnants of Tasha persisted in the region for several more days, bringing heavy rains to much of Queensland.

Impact and aftermath

Following the Bureau of Meteorology's first advice for the tropical low on 24 December, a cyclone warning was declared for areas between Port Douglas and Lucinda, Queensland. Some parts of Queensland were already suffering from flooding and additional rainfall was expected to worsen the situation.

Thousands of hectares of cropland were inundated by floods and many towns and cities were underwater. Efforts to evacuate the entire town of 300 were made as water levels continued to rise. Thousands of people were evacuated by local authorities using military helicopters. The town of Dalby was split in two by the swollen Myall Creek, leaving more than 100 homes flooded. One fatality took place in Mareeba, near where Tasha made landfall, where a man drowned after being swept off a footbridge.

Areas as far south as Brisbane were affected by Tasha. In New South Wales, 175 people were evacuated to emergency shelters as the flooding spread south. An additional 800 people were isolated in the towns of Urbenville and Bonalbo on 28 December as flood waters blocked off roads.

By 28 December, nearly half of Queensland was flooded and preliminary damage estimates exceeded A$1.4 billion. Total economic losses also reached A$6 billion, roughly 0.5% of the nation's gross domestic product. In response to the severe flooding, the Government of Queensland declared numerous towns as disaster areas, allowing for federal funds to be used. By 27 December, flood waters began to recede in Babinda and Gordonvale, leaving behind debris and thick black mud. The following day, Prime Minister Julia Gillard announced that additional Blackhawk helicopters would be sent to assist in evacuation efforts.

See also

2010–11 Queensland floods – Severe flooding in Queensland that took place alongside Tasha's precipitation impact
2010–11 Australian region cyclone season
Cyclone Yasi
Cyclone Oswald – storm of similar strength to Tasha, which was a catalyst in the 2013 Eastern Australia floods.

References

External links
World Meteorological Organization
Australian Bureau of Meteorology (TCWC's Perth, Darwin & Brisbane) 
Joint Typhoon Warning Center (JTWC) 

Category 1 Australian region cyclones
2010 disasters in Australia
2010–11 Australian region cyclone season
Tropical cyclones in Queensland
Tasha
Tropical Cyclones in New South Wales